Uonquén Airport  is an airport serving Uonquén, a village in the Bolívar state of Venezuela. The well-marked grass runway is adjacent to the village.

The village is near a tributary of the Caroni River, an eventual tributary of the Orinoco River.

See also
Transport in Venezuela
List of airports in Venezuela

References

External links
OpenStreetMap - Uonquén Airport
OurAirports - Uonquén
SkyVector - Uonquén
HERE/Nokia - Uonquén

Airports in Venezuela